This is a list of Dutch television related events from 1975.

Events
26 February - Teach-In are selected to represent Netherlands at the 1975 Eurovision Song Contest with their song "Dinge-dong". They are selected to be the twentieth Dutch Eurovision entry during Nationaal Songfestival held at NOS Studios in Hilversum.
22 March - Netherlands wins the 20th Eurovision Song Contest in Stockholm, Sweden. The winning song is "Ding-a-dong", performed by Teach-In.

Debuts

Television shows

1950s
NOS Journaal (1956–present)
Pipo de Clown (1958-1980)

Ending this year

Births
13 March - Claudia de Breij, comedian, singer & talk show host
8 May - Ruben Nicolai, television presenter

Deaths